In geometry, the trigonal trapezohedral honeycomb is a uniform space-filling tessellation (or honeycomb) in Euclidean 3-space. Cells are identical trigonal trapezohedra or rhombohedra. Conway, Burgiel, and Goodman-Strauss call it an oblate cubille.

Related honeycombs and tilings 

This honeycomb can be seen as a rhombic dodecahedral honeycomb, with the rhombic dodecahedra dissected with its center into 4 trigonal trapezohedra or rhombohedra.

It is analogous to the regular hexagonal being dissectable into 3 rhombi and tiling the plane as a rhombille. The rhombille tiling is actually an orthogonal projection of the trigonal trapezohedral honeycomb. A different orthogonal projection produces the quadrille where the rhombi are distorted into squares.

Dual tiling
It is dual to the quarter cubic honeycomb with tetrahedral and truncated tetrahedral cells:

See also
Architectonic and catoptric tessellation

References 

Honeycombs (geometry)